Catheleen Jordan has been a Professor of Social Work at the University of Texas at Arlington School of Social Work since 1994.

Achievements
2017 National Association of Social Workers, Pioneer Award.
2013, National Association of Social Workers-Texas, Lifetime Achievement Award.
2011-2016 Cheryl Milkes Moore Professorship in Mental Health.
2007-2009, President of the Texas chapter of the National Association of Social Workers.
1991-1996 Director, Community Service Clinic, University of Texas Arlington.

Selected writings

References

External links
 Faculty Profile
 Texas chapter of the National Association of Social Workers
 

University of Texas at Arlington faculty
1947 births
Living people
American women non-fiction writers
American women academics
21st-century American women